Javard (also Romanized as Jūrd) is a village in Abali Rural District, Rudehen District, Damavand County, Tehran Province, Iran. At the 2006 census, its population was 270, in 76 families.

References 

Populated places in Damavand County